The Bluff Historic District, in Bluff, Utah, is a  historic district which was listed on the National Register of Historic Places in 1995.  The district included 11 contributing buildings and six contributing sites.

The district is roughly bounded by Main St., U.S. Route 191, 2nd E. St., and the bluffs.

The district includes a total of 11 or 16 contributing buildings and six contributing sites, including five properties already separately listed on the National Register.  The contributing buildings are:
Joseph Frederick Adams House (1898), 
separately NRHP-listed.  Was deteriorated and vacant in 1995. Renovated since.
James Bean Decker House (1898), separately NRHP-listed
Jens Nielson House, on Black Locust Avenue, separately NRHP-listed
Lemuel H. Redd, Jr. House, separately NRHP-listed (photo #1)
John Albert Scorup House, on 7th East Street, separately NRHP-listed
 the old IDS Tithing House/Powell Trading Post, the only contributing building constructed not as a residence (others have been converted)
Kumen Jones House ruin;  the house burned in the 1970s
Barton Cabin on 5th East Street 
Hall House
Richmond House
Willard Butt House, on Mulberry Avenue
Lyman House, on Mulberry Avenue
The six sites are:
Navajo Twin Rocks, a natural formation (
"The Ballroom", or Bluff Ballroom, an alcove in the cliffs, site of dances and other gatherings
Bluff Pioneer Cemetery, on a hill north of town, between town and the bluffs (
Locomotive Rock, a natural formation
Calf Canyon, or at least its entrance
the bluffs north of town

The district includes 30 non-contributing buildings.

The town's historic commercial and institutional buildings have all been demolished, including its school, church, and co-op store.

The Twin Rocks Trading Post, below the Navajo Twin Rocks, is outside of the district. The trading post is well known for Navajo basket and rug weaving, including those designed by artist Damian Jim.

Notes

References

National Register of Historic Places in San Juan County, Utah
Historic districts on the National Register of Historic Places in Utah
Victorian architecture in Utah